2706 may refer to:

2706 Borovský asteroid
Hirth 2706 two stroke aircraft engine
The year in the 28th century